Carroll County is a county located in the U.S. state of Arkansas. As of the 2020 census, the population was 28,260. The county has two county seats, Berryville and Eureka Springs.  Carroll County is Arkansas's 26th county, formed on November 1, 1833, and named after Charles Carroll, the last surviving signer of the United States Declaration of Independence.

Geography

Major highways

 U.S. Highway 62
 U.S. Route 62 Spur
 U.S. Highway 412
 Arkansas Highway 21
 Arkansas Highway 23
 Arkansas Highway 103
 Arkansas Highway 143
 Arkansas Highway 187
 Arkansas Highway 221
 Arkansas Highway 311
 Arkansas Highway 980

Adjacent counties
Stone County, Missouri (north)
Taney County, Missouri (northeast)
Boone County (east)
Newton County (southeast)
Madison County (south)
Benton County (west)
Barry County, Missouri (northwest)

Demographics

2020 census

As of the 2020 United States census, there were 28,260 people, 11,139 households, and 7,497 families residing in the county.

2000 census
As of the 2000 census, there were 25,357 people, 10,189 households, and 7,111 families residing in the county.  The population density was 40 people per square mile (16/km2).  There were 11,828 housing units at an average density of 19 per square mile (7/km2).  The racial composition of the county was 93.63% White, 0.11% Black or African American, 0.88% Native American, 0.41% Asian, 0.08% Pacific Islander, 3.34% from other races, and 1.55% from two or more races.  9.74% of the population were Hispanic or Latino of any race. 10.03% reported speaking Spanish at home .

There were 10,189 households, out of which 29.20% had children under the age of 18 living with them, 57.10% were married couples living together, 8.60% had a female householder with no husband present, and 30.20% were non-families. 25.20% of all households were made up of individuals, and 10.30% had someone living alone, who was 65 years of age or older.  The average household size was 2.47 and the average family size was 2.93.

In the county, the population was spread out, with 24.00% under the age of 18, 8.10% from 18 to 24, 26.20% from 25 to 44, 26.00% from 45 to 64, and 15.80% who were 65 years of age or older.  The median age was 39 years. For every 100 females there were 97.40 males.  For every 100 females age 18 and over, there were 95.30 males.

The median income for a household in the county was $27,924, and the median income for a family was $33,218. Males had a median income of $21,896 versus $18,159 for females. The per capita income for the county was $16,003.  About 11.00% of families and 15.50% of the population were below the poverty line, including 20.70% of those under age 18 and 13.60% of those age 65 or over.

Government and politics

The Eastern District (Berryville and Green Forest) is heavily Republican.  The Western District (Eureka Springs and Beaver) tilts Democratic despite the fact that Holiday Island, a community with a large percentage of relocated snowbirds in the Western District, is overwhelmingly Republican.

In presidential elections, Carroll County has voted for the Democratic candidate only twice since 1952. It voted for Southerners Jimmy Carter in 1976, and Bill Clinton in 1992.

Communities

Cities
Berryville (county seat)
Eureka Springs (county seat)
Green Forest
Holiday Island

Towns
Alpena (partly in Boone County)
Beaver
Blue Eye
Oak Grove

Other unincorporated communities
Carrollton
Rudd 
Osage

Townships

See also
 List of lakes in Carroll County, Arkansas
 National Register of Historic Places listings in Carroll County, Arkansas

References

Further reading

External links

 Carroll County Government site
 Map of Carroll County by the U. S. Census Bureau
 Map of Carroll County at the Encyclopedia of Arkansas
 Carroll County entry at the Encyclopedia of Arkansas
 Carroll County Historical and Genealogical Society 

 
1833 establishments in Arkansas Territory
Populated places established in 1833